Jorge Martínez Ramos (born 3 November 1983 in Trinidad, Uruguay) is a Uruguayan footballer currently playing for Barnechea of the Primera B in Chile.

Club history
 Nueva Chicago, Argentina, 2002-2005
 Temperley, Argentina, 2006-2007
 Gimnasia y Esgrima de Mendoza, Argentina, 2007
 Mineros de Guayana, Venezuela, 2008
 San Marcos de Arica, Chile, 2008
 Minervén, Venezuela, 2008
 San Marcos de Arica, Chile, 2009
 Curicó Unido, Chile, 2010-2011
 Brescia Calcio, Italy, 2011-2012
 Barnechea, Chile, 2012–present

External links
 Profile at BDFA 
 

1983 births
Living people
People from Trinidad, Uruguay
Uruguayan people of Spanish descent
Uruguayan footballers
Uruguayan expatriate footballers
Gimnasia y Esgrima de Mendoza footballers
Club Atlético Temperley footballers
Nueva Chicago footballers
A.C.C.D. Mineros de Guayana players
Curicó Unido footballers
San Marcos de Arica footballers
A.C. Barnechea footballers
Primera B de Chile players
Argentine Primera División players
Expatriate footballers in Chile
Expatriate footballers in Argentina
Expatriate footballers in Venezuela

Association football midfielders